Camilla Gryski (born: Bristol, England) is a Canadian librarian and string figure enthusiast. She has a degree in English, an M.L.S., an M.Ed, and a Montessori Primary Teaching Certificate. She worked in Toronto's Hospital for Sick Children as a Therapeutic Clown.

Awards
C.L.A. Notable Non-Fiction for Children, 1996.
Information Book Award Honour Book for Let's Play, 1996.
Information Book Award for Hands On, Thumbs Up, 1991.
ALA Notable Book for Cat's Cradle, Owl's Eyes, 1984.

Bibliography
Camilla Gryski's cat's cradle: A Book of String Games. illus. Tom Sankey. Scholastic/Kids Can Press, 1995. /.
Camilla Gryski's Favourite String Games. illus. Tom Sankey. Toronto: Kids Can Press, 1995. .
Let's Play: Traditional Games of Childhood. illus. Dušan Petričić. Toronto: Kids Can Press, 1995/2000. .
Friendship Bracelets. Toronto: Kids Can Press, 1992. .
Hands On, Thumbs Up. Toronto: Kids Can Press, 1990. . illus. Pat Cupples. Addison-Wesley. 1991.
Super String Games. illus. Tom Sankey. Toronto: Kids Can Press, 1987.  (paperback)  (hardcover)
Many Stars and More String Games. illus. Tom Sankey. Toronto: Kids Can Press, 1985.  (paperback)  (hardcover)
Cat's Cradle, Owl's Eyes: A Book of String Games. illus. Tom Sankey. Toronto: Kids Can Press, 1983.

See also

List of string figures

Sources

Canadian clowns
Canadian librarians
Canadian women librarians
Living people
String figures
Canadian children's writers
Canadian women children's writers
Year of birth missing (living people)